25B-NBOH (2C-B-NBOH, NBOH-2C-B) is a derivative of the phenethylamine derived hallucinogen 2C-B which has been sold as a designer drug. It acts as a potent serotonin receptor agonist with similar affinity to the better-known compound 25B-NBOMe at 5-HT2A and 5-HT2C receptors with  values of 8.3 and 9.4, respectively.

Legal status

Sweden
The Riksdag added 25B-NBOH to Narcotic Drugs Punishments Act under Swedish Schedule I ("substances, plant materials and fungi which normally do not have medical use") as of January 26, 2016, published by Medical Products Agency (MPA) in regulation HSLF-FS 2015:35 listed as 25B-NBOH, and 2-([2-(4-bromo-2,5-dimetoxifenyl)etylamino]metyl)fenol.

United Kingdom

Analogues and derivatives

References 

25-NB (psychedelics)
Designer drugs
Bromoarenes